Synsepalum aubrevillei is a species of plant in the family Sapotaceae. It is found in Côte d'Ivoire and Ghana, and is threatened by habitat loss.

References

aubrevillei
Vulnerable plants
Taxonomy articles created by Polbot
Taxa named by François Pellegrin
Taxa named by André Aubréville